CURV-III was the fourth generation of the United States Navy Cable-controlled Undersea Recovery Vehicle (CURV).  CURV was a prototype for remotely operated underwater vehicles and a pioneer for teleoperation.  It became famous in 1966 when CURV-I was used to recover a hydrogen bomb from the floor of the Mediterranean Sea.  In 1973, CURV-III performed the deepest underwater rescue in history when it rescued two men  from the ocean surface who were stranded 76 hours in the submersible Pisces III with just minutes of air remaining.  The CURV-III became known in the Great Lakes region in 1976 when it was used to survey the wreck of the SS Edmund Fitzgerald. CURV-21 is the current generation that replaced CURV-III.

History

CURV was developed by Naval Ordnance Test Station, Pasadena, California, US in the early 1960s. CURV was the pioneer for teleoperation. CURV-III is the fourth generation of CURV. The CURV-21 is the next generation following CURV-III and was built as its direct replacement.

CURV-III was sent to the National Museum of the U.S. Navy in 2012 and she is located in the Cold War Gallery.

Features

A cable and surface equipment enabled deployment and operation of the vehicle from a surface support ship. The CURV-III carried: [T]wo Vidicon television cameras, four mercury-vapor headlights, two mercury-vapor spotlights, and a 35-millimeter camera with a 500 frame color film capacity and strobe light ... mounted on two independent pan-and-tilt units, each with 360 degrees of lateral and 180 degrees of vertical movement. The vehicle thus has full viewing and self-inspection capability.Other support systems included active and passive sonar, altimeter, depthometer, and compass. It had a tool assembly mounted on the bow that included a manipulator claw. Other tools and lifting devices could be mounted for particular tasks.

Notable operations

1966 H-bomb recovery

In the Palomares incident of 17 January 1966, a hydrogen bomb was lost in the Mediterranean Sea when a B-52 bomber collided with a KC-135 tanker near Palomares, Spain. After Alvin was unsuccessful in recovering the bomb, the Navy brought in CURV-I.  CURV-I was successful in attaching grapnels to the bomb but became entangled in the bomb's parachute lines. The entangled bomb, parachute, and CURV-I were successfully raised together to the surface 81 days after the original incident.

1973 Pisces III rescue

Pisces III, a Canadian commercial submersible, was used to lay transatlantic telephone cable on the sea bottom off Ireland in 1973. Initial rescue efforts by Pisces III sister submersibles were unsuccessful. Through an international effort of the United States, Canada, and England, CURV-III was deployed within 24 hours 6,000 miles from its home base. Deployment of CURV-III from CCGS John Cabot was hampered by heavy sea conditions. Rapid repairs were made when CURV-III's gyroscope failed and electronics shorted-out after green water came aboard the Cabot. Assisted by the submersibles Pisces II and Pisces V, CURV-III was able to attach lines to the Pisces IIIs hatch. The lines were cut, CURV-III was abandoned, and Pisces III was floated to  where scuba divers were able to attach lines that were used to lift Pisces III the rest of the way to the surface. CURV-III performed the deepest underwater rescue in history when Pisces IIIs two-man crew was rescued after 76 hours with just minutes of air remaining.

1976 SS Edmund Fitzgerald survey

CURV-III became known in the Great Lakes region in 1976 when it was used to survey the wreck of the SS Edmund Fitzgerald. Its mother ship was USCGC Woodrush and logistics support was provided by USCG Point Steel. The dives produced 43,000 feet of videotape and 895 still photographs. The CURV-III underwater survey confirmed that the Fitzgerald was well beyond normal commercial salvage. Observers of the survey concluded that there was more damage to the Fitzgerald than expected but were unable to determine the cause of its foundering. Although operators of CURV-III were fully prepared to recover bodies during the survey, they did not locate any of the 29-man crew. An independent researcher was contracted to review the survey results and produce the sketches of the wreck used in the United States Coast Guard and National Transportation Safety Board investigation reports.

References

External links
Intelligence Resource Program: Cable-controlled Undersea Recovery Vehicle (CURV)
Navy's deep-salvage drone
Survey of Radioactive Waste Disposal Sites Using CURV III

Remotely operated underwater vehicles
Robotic submarines
Unmanned underwater vehicles